Peter Hodulík (born 3 January 1981) is a Slovak football goalkeeper who currently plays for the Majstrovstvá regiónu club PFK Piešťany.

Clubs
1998-2001: Alemannia Aachen
2001-2006: FC Senec
2003-2006: FC Spartak Trnava
2006–2008: AEK Larnaca
?–2011: ŠK Bernolákovo
2011–present: PFK Piešťany

External links

1981 births
Living people
Slovak footballers
Slovak expatriate footballers
Association football goalkeepers
Cypriot First Division players
FC Spartak Trnava players
AEK Larnaca FC players
Alemannia Aachen players
Expatriate footballers in Cyprus
Expatriate footballers in Germany